David Gallego Rodríguez (born 26 January 1972) is a Spanish football manager and former player who played as a midfielder. He is the current manager of SD Ponferradina.

Playing career
Born in Súria, Barcelona, Catalonia, Gallego made his senior debut for CE Manresa, before joining Segunda División B side CE L'Hospitalet in 1991. He continued to appear in the category in the following years, representing AEC Manlleu, Levante UD, UE Sant Andreu, Córdoba CF, Terrassa FC and Hércules CF; with the Egarenses he scored a career-best 19 goals in the 1997–98 campaign.

Gallego returned to Córdoba in January 2001, with the club now in Segunda División. He made his professional debut on 14 January by starting in a 0–0 away draw against Albacete Balompié, and scored his first professional goal seven days later in a 2–0 home win against Sporting de Gijón.

In 2002 summer Gallego joined La Liga club Recreativo de Huelva. He made his debut in the category on 1 September, coming on as a second half substitute in a 2–3 home loss against Málaga CF.

After Recre's relegation, Gallego returned to Terrassa. After suffering another drop, he moved down to the lower leagues, representing CF Badalona and Manresa before retiring in 2009, aged 37.

Managerial career
Immediately after retiring Gallego worked as a manager, being appointed at the helm of CE Sant Feliu Sasserra on 23 January 2010. In July, he returned to former club , and achieved promotion to Segona Catalana with the latter in 2013.

On 25 June 2013, Gallego was appointed manager of RCD Espanyol's youth setup, being in charge of the Juvenil squad. On 16 June 2016 he was named at the helm of the reserve team in the third division.

On 20 April 2018, Gallego was named as the manager of the first team after the sacking of Quique Sánchez Flores. On 30 May, he returned to his previous role.

On 6 June 2019, Gallego replaced Rubi at the helm of the main squad, after agreeing to a two-year contract. On 7 October, however, he was sacked after a poor run of results.

On 21 July 2020, Gallego was named in charge of Sporting de Gijón in the second division. On 22 February 2022, after only achieving three wins in the last 17 matches, he was sacked.

On 20 November 2022, Gallego replaced José Gomes at the helm of SD Ponferradina also in the second level.

Managerial statistics

References

External links

1972 births
Living people
People from Bages
Sportspeople from the Province of Barcelona
Spanish footballers
Footballers from Catalonia
Association football midfielders
La Liga players
Segunda División players
Segunda División B players
Tercera División players
CE Manresa players
CE L'Hospitalet players
AEC Manlleu footballers
Levante UD footballers
UE Sant Andreu footballers
Córdoba CF players
Terrassa FC footballers
Hércules CF players
Recreativo de Huelva players
CF Badalona players
Spanish football managers
La Liga managers
Segunda División managers
Segunda División B managers
RCD Espanyol B managers
RCD Espanyol managers
Sporting de Gijón managers
SD Ponferradina managers